Cynthia Lee may refer to:
 Cynthia Bailey Lee, computer scientist
 Cynthia Cozette Lee, African-American classical music composer and librettist
 Cynthia Ling Lee, American dancer, choreographer, and scholar